Jean Dubois (13 August 1914 - 9 June 2005) was a Belgian sprint canoeist who competed in the late 1940s. In 1939 (during universal exhibition in Liege city) he was world champion. This is why he was selected for London Olympics after the war. At the 1948 Summer Olympics in London, he competed in the C-2 1000 m event. His partner, Hubert Coomans, broke his paddle and they finished unclassified.

References

following his daughter Dubois Nicole living in Liege city Belgium : the family keeps the London 1948 participant medal. Before, in 1939 competition at the universal Liege exhibition on water theme, he was world champion. this is why he was selected for London 1948 Olympics. Date of death 9 june 2005.

1914 births
Belgian male canoeists
Canoeists at the 1948 Summer Olympics
Olympic canoeists of Belgium
Year of death missing